Mercy (1993) is an American graphic novel, written by J. M. DeMatteis and illustrated by Paul Johnson, published by DC Comics' Vertigo imprint.
It tells the tale of bitter, cynical Joshua Rose. While in a coma after a stroke, he finds himself drifting through states of Limbo. There he witnesses the personification of Mercy battling many of the personal demons and afflictions of mankind, including himself. Despite his initial hostility toward her, he finally comes to accept and appreciate her qualities.

External links 

 Cover art of Mercy
1993 graphic novels
Vertigo Comics graphic novels
Fantasy comics
Limbo
Comics by J. M. DeMatteis